Old Basing is a village in Hampshire, England, just east of Basingstoke. It was called Basengum in the Anglo-Saxon Chronicle and Basinges in the Domesday Book.

Etymology
The name Basing comes from two Old English components: Basa, the name of an Anglo-Saxon tribal leader, and the suffix -ingas, meaning "people of". This origin is shared with Basingstoke, which came from adding the additional component stoc, meaning "secondary farm/settlement", reflecting that Basing was originally the larger settlement. The adjective Old was added officially in the 20th century; a 1911 local history referred to the village as Basing, with Old Basing listed as an alternative name.

History 
Old Basing was first settled in the sixth century by a proto-Anglo-Saxon tribe known as the Basingas. In the ninth century it was a royal estate and it was the site of the Battle of Basing on or about 22 January 871 AD, when a Viking army defeated King Æthelred of Wessex and his brother, the future King Alfred the Great. It is also mentioned in the Domesday Book of 1086 AD.

The centre of the village, The Street, contains many old houses, and St Mary's Church. The River Loddon, whose source is in Worting to the west of Basingstoke, flows through the village. Old Basing is perhaps best known for the ruins of Basing House which was built between 1532 and 1561 on the site of a Norman castle. It was the home of the Marquesses of Winchester for several generations before being destroyed after a 24-week siege during the English Civil War. Many names in modern Old Basing allude to the war, such as Cavalier Road and Musket Copse, as well as several sites named after Oliver Cromwell including Oliver's Battery and  Cromwell Cottage. Oliver's, a fish and chip takeaway and restaurant is named after Les Oliver who opened the restaurant in 1974.

The route of the former Basingstoke Canal also ran around Basing House and then through and around parts of Old Basing.

In the 1980s, the Lychpit estate was developed to the north of the village, within the boundaries of the civil parish. In 2006, the name of the civil parish was changed to "Old Basing and Lychpit".

Governance
The village of Old Basing is part of the civil parish of Old Basing and Lychpit which in turn is part of the Basing ward of Basingstoke and Deane borough council. The borough council is a Non-metropolitan district of Hampshire County Council.

The Basing ward elects three councillors to Basingstoke and Deane Borough Council and is part of the Basingstoke constituency in elections to Parliament. The current Member of Parliament for Basingstoke is Maria Miller (Conservative) and the current councillors are Onnalee Cubitt (Independent), Stephen Marks (Conservative) and Sven Godesen (Conservative).

Education 
Old Basing provides both an infant school and a junior school. The junior school, named St Mary's, is aided by the Church of England. A new primary school has recently opened in nearby Lychpit. There are a variety of secondary schools in the Basingstoke area.

Sport 
Old Basing Rovers F.C., founded in 2017, is the local football team and successor to the original Basing Rovers football team founded in 1886 and dissolved in the 1990s. The Recreation Ground in Old Basing is used for a variety of sporting events as well as the Old Basing Carnival. There are rugby union and football pitches which overlap a cricket ground in addition to five tennis courts, an archery area and a lawn bowling green.

Literature 
Edward Lear makes reference to Old Basing in his Book of Nonsense:

There was an Old Person of Basing,
Whose presence of mind was amazing;
He purchased a steed,
Which he rode at full speed,
And escaped from the people of Basing.

People 
 William Paulet, 1st Marquess of Winchester, buried at St. Mary's Church
 John Paulet, 2nd Marquess of Winchester, buried at St. Mary's Church
 Elizabeth Paulet, buried at St. Mary's Church
 William Paulet, 3rd Marquess of Winchester, buried at St. Mary's Church
 Elizabeth Seymour, Lady Cromwell, buried at St. Mary's Church
 William Paulet, 4th Marquess of Winchester, buried at St. Mary's Church
 Charles Paulet, 1st Duke of Bolton, buried at St. Mary's Church

Notes

References

External links 

 Old Basing parish council
 Britannia: History of St. Mary's Church, Old Basing
 

Villages in Hampshire